Sir John Larkins Cheese Richardson (4 August 1810 – 6 December 1878) was a 19th-century New Zealand politician, and a cabinet minister.

Military career
Richardson was born in Bengal, India. His father was Robert Richardson, a civil servant of the East India Company who ran a silk factory. Richardson received his education at the Company's Military Seminary in Addiscombe, Surrey, England. Afterwards, he was in the Bengal Horse Artillery, and rose to the rank of Major. He took part in the Afghan Campaign, 1842 and was decorated for gallantry for his part in the attack on Istalif. In 1845–1846 Richardson also took part in the First Anglo-Sikh War.

Political career

He was Superintendent of Otago Province 1861–1862 at the start of the Otago Gold Rush. He then represented several electorates in Parliament: City of Dunedin in 1862 (resigned), then Dunedin and Suburbs North from 1863 to 1866, then Town of New Plymouth from 1866 to 1867, when he resigned.

He was then appointed to the Legislative Council, of which he was the Speaker from 1868 to 1879. He was knighted in 1874.

Richardson worked with Learmonth White Dalrymple to establish a girls' high school in Dunedin, and for women to be admitted as students of the University of Otago.

University of Otago
Richardson was an inaugural member of the council of the University of Otago in 1869, becoming the university's Chancellor in 1871, and was also a member of the New Zealand University Council. He was responsible for allowing women to enroll at the university and helped to remove barriers for their entry. This allowed the university to be the first in Australasia to enroll women. The University of Otago's tallest building, the Richardson Building, is named in his honour. Richardson's granddaughter, Josephine Gordon Rich, studied with Thomas Jefferson Parker at the university, and published a scientific paper, but does not appear in student lists, probably because her home-schooling made her ineligible to enrol.

Richardson died at Dunedin on 6 December 1878 and was buried at Dunedin Northern Cemetery.

References

Morrell, W.P. (1969) The University of Otago: A centennial history. Dunedin: University of Otago Press.

|-

|-

1810 births
1878 deaths
Members of the Cabinet of New Zealand
Members of the New Zealand House of Representatives
Speakers of the New Zealand Legislative Council
Superintendents of New Zealand provincial councils
New Zealand MPs for Dunedin electorates
Settlers of Otago
Members of the New Zealand Legislative Council
British East India Company people
Burials at Dunedin Northern Cemetery
19th-century New Zealand politicians
People of the Otago Gold Rush
Chancellors of the University of Otago